In Greek mythology, Amymone (Ancient Greek: Αμυμωνη means the "blameless" one) was a daughter of Danaus, king of Libya and Europe, a queen. As the "blameless" Danaid, her name identifies her as, perhaps, identical to Hypermnestra ("great wooing" or "high marriage"), also the one Danaid who did not assassinate her Egyptian husband on their wedding night, as her 49 sisters did. (See the myth at the entry for Danaus.) The author of the Bibliotheca, in his list of names for the Danaids, does mention both Hypermnestra and Amymone, however (Library 2.1.5).

Mythology 
Poseidon had dried up all the region' of Argos' springs after the Argolid was awarded to the protection of Hera. It would appear from the myth that Poseidon preceded Hera in the heartland of her cult. But he rescued Amymone from a chthonic satyr that was about to rape her. To possess her himself, the god revealed the springs of Lerna, a cult site of great antiquity near the shores of the Argolid. To Poseidon she bore Nauplius, "the navigator", who gave his name to the port city of Argos.

Amymone, the blameless, was eventually reconciled with her father, and given in marriage to Lynceus, with whom she founded a race of kings that led to Danaë, the mother of Perseus, founder of Mycenae. Thus this founding myth of Argos also asserts that Argos was the metropolis ("mother city") of Mycenae.

Amymone/Hypermnestra is represented with a water pitcher, a reminder of the sacred springs and lake of Lerna and of the copious wells that made Argos the "well-watered" and, by contrast, a reminder that her sisters were forever punished in Tartarus for their murderous crimes by fruitlessly drawing water in pitchers with open bases.

Aeschylus wrote a now lost satyr play called Amymone about the seduction of Amymone by Poseidon, which followed the trilogy that included The Suppliants.

References 

 Apollodorus, The Library with an English Translation by Sir James George Frazer, F.B.A., F.R.S. in 2 Volumes, Cambridge, MA, Harvard University Press; London, William Heinemann Ltd. 1921. . Online version at the Perseus Digital Library. Greek text available from the same website.

External links
Carlos Parada, "Greek Mythology Link": Danaids
 Amymone and Poseidon. Continuous Narrative on Roman Mosaics

Danaids
Princesses in Greek mythology
Women of Poseidon
Mortal parents of demigods in classical mythology
Libyan characters in Greek mythology
Mythology of Argos